The Australian Law Students' Association is a confederation of Australian law student associations and societies, representing some 28,000 students in all. All Australian law student societies are members.

References

External links
Australian Law Students' Association
ALSA Conference Website

Legal education in Australia
Student societies in Australia
1979 establishments in Australia